Buchema melanacme is a species of sea snail, a marine gastropod mollusk in the family Horaiclavidae.

It was formerly included within the family Turridae.

Description
The length of the elongate-ovate, black shell attains 8 mm, its diameter 3 mm. The shell contains 7½ whorls of which 1½ in the protoconch. The upper half of each whorl is concave, and not crossed by the ribs, which are situated below. Of the three spiral lirations which connect the ribs, the upper one is rather more slender than the others. There is a slight thickening just below the suture.. The body whorl contains 15 spiral ribs. The small aperture is red and measures ⅓ of the total length of the shell. The sinus is small and is slightly situated below the suture. The siphonal canal is very short.

Distribution
This marine species occurs in the Caribbean Sea off Saint Vincent.

References

External links
  Tucker, J.K. 2004 Catalog of recent and fossil turrids (Mollusca: Gastropoda). Zootaxa 682:1–1295.
 Fallon, Phillip J , Descriptions and illustrations of some new and poorly known turrids of the tropical northwestern Atlantic. Part 1. Genera Buchema Corea, 1934 and Miraclathurella Woodring, 1928 (Gastropoda: Turridae: Crassispirinae); Nautilus 124, 2010
 

melanacme
Gastropods described in 1882